Martin Keller (born September 26, 1986 in Rochlitz, East Germany) is a track and field sprint athlete who competes internationally for Germany.

Keller represented Germany at the 2008 Summer Olympics in Beijing. He competed at the 4x100 metres relay together with Tobias Unger, Alexander Kosenkow and Till Helmke. In their qualification heat they placed third behind Jamaica and Canada, but in front of China. Their time of 38.93 was the sixth fastest out of sixteen participating nations in the first round and they qualified for the final. There they sprinted to a time of 38.58 seconds, which was the fifth time.

References
 

1986 births
Living people
People from Rochlitz
People from Bezirk Karl-Marx-Stadt
German male sprinters
Olympic athletes of Germany
Athletes (track and field) at the 2008 Summer Olympics
European Athletics Championships medalists
Sportspeople from Saxony